Footloose is a 1998 musical based on the 1984 film of the same name. The music is by Tom Snow (among others), the lyrics by Dean Pitchford (with additional lyrics by Kenny Loggins), and the book by Pitchford and Walter Bobbie.

Plot

Act 1
("Footloose/On any Sunday") Ren McCormack, an ordinary city teenager, is in a dance club in Chicago, dancing off his stresses bored of his long and arduous eight-hour work day. But this is his last visit; he tells his friends that due to financial pressures brought on by his father's abandonment, he and his mother Ethel are moving to a small town in the middle of nowhere named Bomont (much to the chagrin of his friends, who gripe, "Bomont?! Where the hell is Bomont?!"), where his aunt and uncle have offered them a place to stay. Once there, Ren and Ethel attend church and get their first glimpse of the minister Shaw Moore, a conservative minister who is a big authority figure in the town. After a long sermon lambasting the evils of "rock and roll" music and its "endless chant of pornography", Moore's daughter Ariel runs off to a gas station to meet her "trailer trash" boyfriend Chuck Cranston, along with his buddies Travis and Lyle. Chuck and Ariel are only together for the sex ("The Girl Gets Around"). While they embrace, Moore shows up and catches Chuck with his hands around his daughter, much to his displeasure.

The next day, Ren shows up for school and Willard Hewitt, a slow-witted cowboy with a bad attitude and a strong loyalty to his mother, decides to beat him up but Ren goes along with it and doesn't mind. So, they become friends. Ren tells Willard about the dancing he used to do in Chicago ("I Can't Stand Still"). Willard tries to stop him from dancing in the middle of the school, but Ren ignores him and puts on a show in front of the school principal, who angrily explains that dancing is illegal in the town of Bomont. Willard defends Ren, saying that he is new in town and does not know the rules. After the principal leaves, Rusty, who is madly in love with Willard, tells him how brave he is to have stood up to the principal on Ren's behalf. Rusty and her friends, Wendy Jo and Urleen, then explain to a bemused Ren that dancing is illegal after Moore passed a law forbidding dancing after a horrifying car accident involving four kids returning from a dance. They then warn him to lie low unless he wants to get into even more trouble than he already is. ("Somebody's Eyes").

Ariel returns home to a disgruntled Shaw, who stubbornly ignores her despite her repeated attempts to engage conversation with him. Exasperated, she leaves the room in a huff, leaving Moore and Vi, his wife, alone to bicker over her. Shaw expresses his concern over Ariel's relationship with Chuck Cranston, but when Vi attempts to assure him their fling will soon cool down, he silences her and storms off to finish writing his sermon. Ethel, fed up with the groundless suspicion that Ren is forced to suffer as the "new kid", commiserates alongside Vi. They are joined by Ariel, and lament how no one ever listens to them, everyone being so set in their own ways that they are seldom allowed to get a word in edgewise ("Learning to be Silent").

After school that day, several of the students go to the Burger Blast, a burger restaurant. Ariel, Rusty and their friends are doing homework at a table while Willard talks to Ren, who is dressed up in a waiter's uniform and roller skates, as he has just been hired to work at the restaurant. When Ren takes Ariel's order, she flirts with him. Willard warns Ren that Chuck Cranston would not be happy if Ren were to become involved with Ariel. Ren then proceeds to question Willard about his relationship with Rusty, to which Willard proclaims that he thinks she is very good-looking, but is confused by her non-stop talking. Ariel is talking with her friends about how she wants to find a decent guy ("Holding Out for a Hero"). Chuck shows up in a fury and starts to yell at Ariel. Ren and Willard come to her defense, but it's Betty Blast, the restaurant owner, who breaks up the fight.

After Ren gets off work, Ariel takes him to her secret place beneath the train tracks where she discusses her hatred of Bomont. Unbeknownst to them, Chuck witnesses the pair together.

Afterwards, Ren walks her home, catching Moore and Vi by surprise, as they had believed that Ariel was at home in her room all the while. On top of Shaw's displeasure at his daughter's disobedience, a nervous Ren unintentionally insults him in an attempt to ease his worries, making the situation more awkward and causing all of Shaw's friends (who were over playing a game of bridge) to dash off. An irritated Shaw then sternly orders Ariel to cease her visits with him, but Ariel retaliates, claiming that he is doing no more than make her feel like a prisoner. After a fed up daughter and wife storm off in a rage, Shaw begins to feel a pang of guilt, pondering whether or not he is being fair with his daughter while considering the problematic task of being both a preacher and a father ("Heaven Help Me").

At school the next day, Ren shows up late to gym class with Ariel and Willard and explains to the teacher that he was jumped by Chuck, but the teacher won't listen. Ren laments that the citizens of Bomont are so "wound up", muttering that at least in Chicago, he had the clubs to turn to in times of stress. After a quip by Willard suggesting that they "should take the coach dancing", Ren realizes that throwing a dance would be the perfect way to alleviate the teenagers' pressures, while at the same time making a statement to Moore and the town council. Willard tells Ren that he is insane, but Ren won't listen and reveals his plan to all of the students, eventually winning them over. Word catches on to Moore, who, as the one responsible for banning it to begin with, is determined to do anything within his power to ensure that it does not happen ("I'm Free/Heaven Helps The Man").

Act 2
Ren, Ariel, Willard and Rusty are in a town neighboring Bomont, where there is a big dance hall, complete with a country band ("Still Rocking"). Rusty repeatedly attempts to dance with Willard, but he weasels his way out, dragging Ren off to the bar to get drinks. There, he explains to Ren that he doesn't know how to dance. Rusty overhears them, as do several cowboys, who begin to mock Willard. Rusty comes to his defense, saying that he might not be perfect, but she loves him anyway ("Let's Hear it for the Boy"). During Rusty's song, Ren tries to teach Willard to dance, who after much initial stumbling and apprehension whips off an amazing dance combination, much to Rusty's surprise.

Chuck Cranston then shows up at the Moores' home. When he tells them that Ariel is not where they think she is, Vi and Shaw becomes very worried. Chuck leaves, and shortly after Ariel then shows up pretending she was at her friend's house studying, but her parents reveal that they know she wasn't there. After an argument between Shaw and Ariel, Vi intervenes. Vi then tries to console him while telling him that his reprimanding is not all that logical ("Can You Find it in Your Heart?").

Meanwhile, Ren, Willard and their friends are trying to find a way to present their idea to the town council. Ren goes over his speech ("Dancing Is Not A Crime") but his friends aren't too sure about it. Ren is extremely discouraged and considers forgetting the whole idea. Willard gives Ren some advice that his beloved mother told him and explains that he can't give up ("Mama Says - You can't back down/Mama Says  - You can't back down - Reprise"). Just as Ren's confidence has built up, Ariel shows up with a black eye and tells Ren that Chuck beat her up. Ariel tells everyone to leave her alone, but Ren comforts Ariel instead. The two go out to the train station Ariel took Ren to in Act 1. Ariel reveals that her brother was in the car accident that led to the dancing ban. She gives Ren a Bible marked with various passages he can use for his motion. It is then they both realize they've fallen in love with each other ("Almost Paradise").

At the town council meeting, Ren stands up and explains to the council, including the principal, coach, his aunt & uncle, and Moore, that dancing is written about in the Bible and should not be illegal. Ren is favorably supported, but the members don't listen and the motion is dismissed.

After the meeting, Ethel explains that Shaw had those votes locked no matter what, and she suggests that Ren go talk to him face to face. Ren goes to the pastor's house and explains to him that he should not take his anguish about his son's death out on the entire town. They argue, but when Ren points out that they're both dealing with loss — Moore's loss of his son, Ren's loss of his father — they realize a common bond. Ren leaves, but struck by Ren's insight, Moore struggles with what to do. Ariel tells him that she believes him and reminds him about his sermon in the morning. She leaves, but Shaw is still struggling. (Heaven Help Me Reprise)

At the next service, Shaw tells the whole congregation that he is going to allow the teenagers to hold a dance. They are overjoyed. Ren asks Ariel to the dance and Willard invites Rusty, telling her that he is even willing to dance with her. After the crowd leaves, Vi and Shaw are left alone, where Shaw tells Vi how much he loves her and how he has made many mistakes in the past ("Can You Find it in Your Heart? Reprise"). In the end, Shaw, his wife, and all the rest of the townsfolk attend the huge dance to celebrate the abolishment of banning dancing in their hometown except for Chuck, who soon shows up to take revenge on Ren for selling out the town, only to be subdued and chased away by Willard and Rusty for showing up uninvited to this celebration ("Footloose (Finale)").

Songs

 Act I
 "Footloose/On Any Sunday" – Everyone
 "The Girl Gets Around" – Chuck, Travis, Lyle, Ariel
 "I Can't Stand Still" – Ren
 "Somebody's Eyes" – Rusty, Urleen, Wendy Jo
 "Learning to Be Silent" – Vi, Ethel, Ariel
 "Holding Out for a Hero" – Ariel, Rusty, Urleen, Wendy Jo
 "Somebody's Eyes (Reprise)" – Rusty, Urleen, Wendy Jo
 "Heaven Help Me" – Shaw
 "I'm Free (Heaven Helps the Man)" – Kids & Adults

 Act II
 "Still Rockin'" – Cowboy Bob & Band
 "Let's Hear It for the Boy" – Rusty
 "Can You Find it in Your Heart" – Vi
 "Mama Says" – Willard, Bickle, Garvin, Jeter, Ren
 "Almost Paradise" – Ren, Ariel
 "Dancing Is Not A Crime" – Ren
 "Heaven Help Me (Reprise)" – Shaw
 "Can You Find it in Your Heart? (Reprise)" – Shaw
 "Footloose (Finale)" – Everyone

In April 2005, the show was revised slightly. Aside from numerous tweakings to the script, there are slight differences in the revised version's musical numbers. Chief among these is a brand new song opening Act II called "Still Rockin'". Other changes include the removal of the 'rap' "Dancing is not a Crime". Only the very first section of the rap is used and right before "Mama Says" instead of during the Town Council meeting. Ren gives a speech instead during the meeting. Also, the Reverend's song "I Confess" has also been removed and replaced with a much longer and more emotional scene with Ren after the Town Council meeting and a short reprise of "Heaven Help Me" sung by Reverend Moore alone. Furthermore, the show now begins with Rusty, Wendy Jo, and Urleen singing the opening of "Footloose" instead of Ren and the boys, and during "Learning to be Silent", Ariel sings with Vi and Ethel during the song. "Mama says" was also shortened and cut Jeter, Bickle, and Garvin's solos.

Instrumentation
Footloose requires a pit orchestra in a rock combo style. The instrumentation calls for two keyboards, two guitars, bass guitar, drums, percussion, and a woodwind player. The woodwind player doubles on clarinet, flute, tenor sax, and baritone sax. The first keyboard part is played by the conductor. In the original Broadway production, there was also music for solo violin and cello.

Productions

Broadway production
The musical Footloose opened at Broadway's Richard Rodgers Theatre on October 22, 1998 and ran for 709 performances until July 2, 2000. It was directed by Walter Bobbie with choreography by AC Ciulla.

Footloose received mixed critical reception. General consensus was that the show was in and of itself poor, but the music and talented cast made it entertaining. It was nominated for four Tony Awards. The wardrobe is on display at the Costume World Broadway Collection in Pompano Beach, Florida.

Original London production
A London production, billed as both Footloose: The Musical and simply Footloose in different press accounts, opened at the Novello Theatre on the Strand, following a United Kingdom touring version. It premiered on April 18, 2006, and closed November 11, 2006. Directed by Karen Bruce, the creative team included Morgan Large designing sets and costumes, James Whiteside as lighting designer, and Mike Dixon and Chris Egan as musical supervisors.

British national tours

Footloose, directed by Paul Kerryson, premiered in the UK at the Theatre Royal, Plymouth in February 2004, where it played for three weeks before embarking on a 24-week national tour. A second UK national tour opened on January 4, 2006, at the Wales Millennium Centre in Cardiff Bay. This time directed by Karen Bruce, it starred Cheryl Baker and Stephen McGann and went on to tour another 11 venues mainly in the south of England and Scotland.

The production transferred into London's West End, starring David Essex and Cheryl Baker in April 2006, before closing in November of the same year – due to the limited availability of the Novello Theatre. The production then embarked its third national tour, which opened in Salford in January 2007, and continued until July 2007, starring Lyn Paul. Then the cast returned to London at the Playhouse Theatre from August 17, 2007 through December 6, 2007; Lyn Paul continued her role. Footloose returned to the West End in September 2017 at the Peacock Theatre with Gareth Gates and Maureen Nolan confirmed to take on the roles of Willard and Vi Moore.

A brand new production of the musical, directed by Racky Plews, will now return for a fourth UK & International tour, premiering at the Maag Halle in Zürich on January 19, 2022. It will then open in the UK at the Theatre Royal, Plymouth, in February 2022 and is set to close in August 2022 at the New Wimbledon Theatre.

US 10th Anniversary national tour
Prather Entertainment Group produced a "10th Anniversary" U.S. tour of Footloose.

Casts

Awards and nominations

Original Broadway production

References

External links

 
Footloose at guidetomusicaltheatre.com

1998 musicals
Broadway musicals
Musicals based on films
Teen musicals